Edward Samuel Miller (November 11, 1923 – July 1, 2013) was the deputy assistant director of the Inspections Division under Mark Felt with the United States Federal Bureau of Investigation. He was known for the 1980 trial for conspiracy of injuring and oppressing the citizens of the United States and his investigation of the Weather Underground group.

Military and FBI career 
He served with the United States Army from November 1942 until February 1946 as platoon sergeant in the Battle of Okinawa during the Pacific Theater. He joined the FBI in February 1950 and served until October 1974.

1980 conviction and pardon 
In November 1980, Miller, then head of the FBI's Domestic Intelligence Division, and Mark Felt were convicted after a seven-week federal jury trial of having "conspired to injure and oppress the citizens of the United States" and Miller was fined $3,500. While the convictions were being appealed in April 1981, President Ronald Reagan pardoned both men. At the time of trial, Felt and Miller were the highest-ranking bureau employees to have been tried for a criminal offense.

Personal 
He had been married to Patricia Clark since September 2, 1950. He left three children and numerous grandchildren and great-grandchildren. He died peacefully on July 1, 2013, in Fairfax, Virginia. He had been living in Fairfax since March 1962, when he moved from San Francisco to work with the FBI in Washington, D.C.

See also
 John W. Nields Jr.
List of people pardoned or granted clemency by the president of the United States

References

1923 births
2013 deaths
People from East Pittsburgh, Pennsylvania
Federal Bureau of Investigation agents
Federal Bureau of Investigation agents convicted of crimes
Recipients of American presidential pardons
Military personnel from Pennsylvania
People convicted of depriving others of their civil rights
United States Army personnel of World War II